The YM2612, a.k.a. OPN2, is a sound chip developed by Yamaha. It is a member of Yamaha's OPN family of FM synthesis chips, and is derived from the YM2203.

The YM2612 is a six-channel FM synthesizer. It was used in several game and computer systems, most notably in Sega's Mega Drive/Genesis video game console as well as Fujitsu's FM Towns computer series.

As with the YM3438, it was used by Sega in various arcade game systems, including the Mega-Play and Sega System 32.

Features
The YM2612 has the following features:
Six concurrent FM synthesis channels (voices)
Four operators per channel
Two interval timers
A sine-wave low frequency oscillator
Integrated stereo output digital-to-analog converter (most other contemporary Yamaha FM chips require a separate external D/A converter chip)
Per-channel programmable stereo sound (left, right, or both left and right resulting in centre)
For channel three, operator frequencies can be set independently, making dissonant harmonics possible. (Normally, they would have a simple relation like e.g. 2× or 3× relative to a common base frequency)

Technical details 
The YM2612's FM synthesis block is an extended version of the FM block featured in the YM2203, adding three FM channels and integrating a stereo output DAC. The YM2612 removes the SSG component (although retaining its envelope generators) and I/O ports found in the YM2203, YM2608 and YM2610. It was also available in CMOS form as the YM3438, a.k.a. OPN2C.

Whereas the high-end OPN chips such as the YM2608 have dedicated ADPCM channels for playing sampled audio, the YM2612 does not. However, its sixth channel can act as a basic PCM channel by means of the 'DAC Enable' register, disabling FM output for that channel but allowing it to play 8-bit pulse-code modulation sound samples. Unlike the other OPNs with ADPCM, the YM2612 does not provide any timing or buffering of samples, so all frequency control and buffering must be done in software by the host processor.

Output DAC peculiarities  

Unlike most Yamaha FM chips which require an external floating-point DAC, the YM2612 features a built-in 9-bit DAC, which uses time-division multiplexing to play one sample of each channel in sequence, similar to the YM2413. Due to an error with the amplitude voltage in the original chip design, a peculiar form of crossover distortion is introduced in the output. Additionally, because of the reduced dynamic range of the built-in DAC, additional distortion may be generated when playing sounds with a very high volume.

Variants

Yamaha YM3438 
The YM3438, a.k.a. OPN2C, is a modified CMOS version of the YM2612. This version has an improved built-in DAC that reduced the peculiar crossover distortions caused by the amplitude voltage errors present in the YM2612. It is not a direct, drop-in replacement for the YM2612 however, as the sound outputs have higher impedance.

Yamaha YMF276 
The YMF276, a.k.a. OPN2L, is a low-power version of the YM3438, used in the Fujitsu FM Towns II. It came in a smaller 24-pin SOP package. Unlike the YM2612 and YM3438, the YMF276 requires an external DAC chip. For this reason, the YM3433 was designed specifically for this version.

Sega Mega Drive/Genesis ASICs made by Yamaha (FC1004, FF1004, FJ3002 and FQ8007) 
The YM3438 core was integrated in custom ASICs used in most revisions of the Model 2 version of the Sega Mega Drive/Genesis.

Game audio 
Used in conjunction with the Texas Instruments SN76489 PSG as the main sound generators of the Sega Mega Drive/Genesis console, the YM2612 was prominently utilized by numerous prolific video game music composers, such as Yuzo Koshiro.

Other uses 
In 2020, the company Twisted Electrons released the MEGAfm, a desktop synthesizer module that uses two YM2612 chips.

A VST, AU and AAX and Reason Studios Rack Extension plugin called RYM2612 was made by Inphonik. This includes cycle accurate envelopes and quirks of the original chip.  They also offer a free sample and bitrate reduction plugin, the PCM2612, that emulates the timbre of the original chip playing a sample through the DAC channel.

See also 
VGM – an audio file format for multiple video game platforms, including the Sega Mega Drive/Genesis
Yamaha YM2203
Yamaha YM2608

References

External links
 Nuked-OPN2 YM3438/YM2612 emulator
 RYMCast - SEGA Mega Drive / Genesis  VGM player

YM2612
Video game music technology